"The Dome and the Domicile" is the second episode of the TV series Medici: Masters of Florence, directed by Sergio Mimica-Gezzan and starring Dustin Hoffman and Richard Madden. It was released on 18 October 2016. It got 7.14 million viewers in Italy.

Plot
The war with Milan is going badly and Florence's economy is in ruins. Cosimo funds Filippo Brunelleschi to build a dome for the cathedral creating work and brokers a deal between Lucca and the Duke of Milan for peace. Twenty years earlier, Giovanni forces Cosimo to marry Contessina, the strong-willed daughter of a noble banker with financial problems, forcing Cosimo to give up his dreams of being an artist.

Cast

References

External links
 

2016 British television episodes
Television episodes set in Italy
Television episodes directed by Sergio Mimica-Gezzan
Television episodes written by Frank Spotnitz
Television episodes written by Nicholas Meyer
Drama television episodes
Alternate history television episodes